The Virginia Police Canine Association (VPCA) is a professional law enforcement association that trains and supports police canines and handlers for member law enforcement agencies. Police canine teams can be certified in narcotics detection, explosives detection, cadaver detection, search and rescue, wildlife detection, and Patrol/Utility. Patrol/Utility canine teams are certified in criminal apprehension, tracking, article recovery, building and area searches, and crowd control. Member agencies consist of Police Departments and Sheriff's Offices all across northern and central Virginia.

Along with practical hands-on scenario-based training sessions, VPCA strives to ensure that its members are proficient in the courtroom as well as on the streets. Periodic Legal Update courses and court-related training sessions are conducted to enhance the K9 Handler's courtroom testimony and preparation of court documentation. Peer Reviews, report writing conferences, and case-management sessions are also conducted throughout the year to maintain the high level of professionalism demanded of Police K9 Teams. Case Law studies and Moot Court scenarios are also conducted to keep K9 Handlers, Supervisors, and local judicial officials apprised of changes in case law and of strategies when prosecuting K9 cases.

Goals & Objectives
The Goals and Objectives of the VPCA are:
 To unite and assist all law enforcement agencies in the training and continued improvement of all Police work dogs.
 To establish a working standard for all police work dogs, Handlers and trainers through an Accreditation program.
 To provide educational material through publications, visual aids, and training seminars.
 To improve the image of the working police canines to the general public through improved public service in the prevention and detection of crime.
 To continually train and improve the services of the canine as an aid in the prevention and detection of crime.
 To strive to educate the general public of the abilities of working police canines through demonstrations and public events.
 To endeavor to establish the highest standard of training, and to certify the abilities of the canine in police work.
 To coordinate peer reviews and the exchange of ideas for advanced training techniques utilizing police canines.
 To endeavor to maintain high levels of knowledge of US and Virginia case law relating to police canines.
 To assist law enforcement agencies in establishing and maintaining the highest standards for the canine sections of their respective departments.

Certification Testing
All K9 Teams undergo Certification Testing annually, in accordance with the VPCA's established Certifications guidelines. In order to be deemed 'Certified' through VPCA, K9 Teams must prove their proficiency in the areas in which the K9 Team will function in real life situations. Certification tests and weekly K9 training sessions are conducted using scenario-based evolutions that are consistent with real-life performance. VPCA minimizes the amount of pattern-based training sessions, and focuses on actions in training being performed as they would be in real-life incidents. VPCA also uses many training areas throughout member Agency jurisdictions to reduce environmental training, or the pattern-based training that comes with training repeatedly in the same training field. K9 Teams operate in a variety of environments and locations, and VPCA feels that the training should cover the vast variety of environments and locations as well.

K9 Teams may be certified in any of the following phases:
 Obedience
 Agility
 Tracking
 Trailing
 Patrol Utility
 Area Search
 Search & Rescue Area Search
 Article Search
 Building Search
 Criminal Apprehension/Aggression Control
 Narcotic Detection
 Explosive Detection
 Accelerant Detection
 Cadaver Search
 Wildlife Detection

See also

 List of law enforcement agencies in Virginia
 Virginia Police Canine Association - official website

References

External links
Virginia Police Canine Association - official website
Manassas City Police Department - official website
Manassas City Police Association's 9th Annual Memorial Run

Law enforcement in Virginia